Film directors struggled to maintain the integrity of the film industry. They went on strikes to keep theaters from shutting down. In this year, Yvonn Hem bought another theater for $400,000. A list of films produced  in Cambodia in 1974. From the 35 films listed, 2 films exist today, 7 have been remade, and 28 have not yet been remade.

See also 
1974 in Cambodia

References 
 

1974
Films
Cambodian